Adesmus clathratus is a species of beetle in the family Cerambycidae. It was described by Johannes von Nepomuk Franz Xaver Gistel in 1848. It is known from Brazil.

References

Adesmus
Beetles described in 1848